Navy Football Club is a Thai professional football club under the stewardship of Royal Thai Navy based in Chonburi. They play in the Thai League 3. The club has previously played under the names of Royal Thai Navy FC, Rajnavi FC and Rajnavy Rayong FC.

History

The club was formed on 10 January 1956 as the Royal Thai Navy Football Club and currently plays under the name of Navy Football Club, locally known as Rajnavy. The club has also played under the names of Rajnavi and Rajnavy Rayong, Rayong being the town they played in and the main base of the Navy in general.

Since the inception of the Thai League in 1996 the club played under the name of the Royal Thai Navy up until 2009, when all teams in Thailand had to become public limited companies. With this, many teams changed names and formed closer links with the communities they were based in. In this case the Navy became known as Rajnavy Rayong. Rajnavy being the local Thai name for the Navy. In 2011, and with a dispute as to the ownership of the club, the club moved from their Rayong home and into the Chonburi province where they ground share with Pattaya United – another club playing outside of their original home town – albeit against league rules, where two sides in the PLT cannot ground share.

Ownership dispute

In 2009, when Thai football was becoming increasingly popular with all professional football teams told to properly register and become a company limited, the situation was almost to the point where anyone could register this football club for an ownership. At this point, Rayong Thai Premier took the ownership and renamed the club to Rajnavy Rayong. However, two seasons after that, the Royal Thai Navy decided to bring the team back under control and renamed it to Siam Navy. Thereafter, the football club moved from Rayong to Sattahip, Chonburi.

Turmoil

At the start of the 2011 league campaign, with the Navy in a bit of turmoil after the dispute of the owner of the club, they proceeded to get it wrong on the field as well. Their opening game of the season against Sisaket, was awarded 2–0 to Sisaket after an original 1–1 draw due to Siam Navy playing an ineligible player. To make things worse, the club knew the player in question couldn't play, but carried on hoping to get away with any sanctions – especially since the league is normally lax in the rules.

Queens Cup success

In 2006 the club won the opening season Queen's Cup tournament. A tournament that is not mandatory but nonetheless a big part of the Thai football calendar at the time. They defeated Krung Thai Bank in the final after getting past Bangkok Bank at the semi-final stage.

Yo-yo club

The club has somewhat become known as a yo-yo club in the Thai football scene, being relegated and promoted from/to the top flight on four occasions. Although on each occasion they were promoted they were not as champions.

Honours
 Thai Division 1 League:
Runner-up: 2006
 Queen's Cup:
Winner: 2006
 Thai League Cup:
Winner: 1990
 Khor Royal Cup:
Winner: 1989
 Ngor Royal Cup:
Winner: 1974

Stadium and locations by season records

Season by season domestic record

P = Played
W = Games won
D = Games drawn
L = Games lost
F = Goals for
A = Goals against
Pts = Points
Pos = Final position
N/A = No answer

T1 = Thai League 1
T2 = Thai League 2
T3 = Thai League 3

QR1 = First Qualifying Round
QR2 = Second Qualifying Round
QR3 = Third Qualifying Round
QR4 = Fourth Qualifying Round
RInt = Intermediate Round
R1 = Round 1
R2 = Round 2
R3 = Round 3

R4 = Round 4
R5 = Round 5
R6 = Round 6
GR = Group stage
QF = Quarter-finals
SF = Semi-finals
RU = Runners-up
S = Shared
W = Winners

Players

Current squad

Out on loan

References

External links
 Official Website

Thai League 1 clubs
Football clubs in Thailand
Association football clubs established in 1956
Sport in Chonburi province
1956 establishments in Thailand
Royal Thai Navy F.C.
Military association football clubs in Thailand